John Nathan Deal (born August 25, 1942) is an American lawyer and politician who served as the 82nd governor of Georgia from 2011 to 2019. He was elected to the United States House of Representatives as a member of the Democratic Party in 1992 and switched to the Republican Party in 1995. On March 1, 2010, Deal announced his resignation from Congress to run for Governor of Georgia.

Deal faced a crowded field of candidates in the July 2010 Republican primary election, ultimately facing former Georgia Secretary of State Karen Handel in a tightly contested August 10, 2010, primary runoff election, and won by fewer than 2,500 votes. The following day, Handel declined to pursue a recount and conceded. On November 2, Democratic opponent Roy Barnes called to concede the race for governor of Georgia, making Deal the governor-elect to succeed term-limited Sonny Perdue in 2011.

Deal won his re-election campaign for governor in 2014 against Democrat Jason Carter. He was succeeded by then-Secretary of State Brian Kemp.

Early life
Deal was born on August 25, 1942 in the town of Millen and grew up on a farm in Sandersville, Georgia. His parents, Mary (née Mallard) and Noah Jordan Deal, were teachers.

He attended Mercer University in Macon, where he earned his bachelor and law degrees with honors. After he earned his Juris Doctor degree in 1966, he joined the United States Army, where he earned the rank of captain.

Deal spent twenty-three years in private law practice. He was also a criminal prosecutor, a Hall County juvenile court judge, and a Northeastern Judicial Circuit superior court judge. In 1980, he was elected to the Georgia Senate as a Democrat.

In November 1990, he was elected by his party to be the President Pro Tempore, the second highest ranking position in the chamber. Democrat Jane R. Hemmer replaced him, but was defeated by Republican Casey Cagle.

U.S. House of Representatives (1993–2010)

Elections

He was re-elected as a Democrat in 1994.

However, on April 11, 1995, shortly after Republicans assumed control of the U.S. House of Representatives for the first time in 40 years, Deal joined the Republican Party, which was led by Speaker Newt Gingrich, a fellow Georgian. Years later, Gingrich said that Deal became a Republican because he liked what he saw in the Contract With America.

Deal was handily re-elected in his first election as a Republican in the 1996 general election, even though Jenkins endorsed his Democratic opponent, attorney McCracken "Ken" Poston. This was the first time his district had elected a Republican for a full term since Reconstruction. To date, Poston is the last Democrat to win even 30 percent of the vote in this district.

Deal was unopposed for re-election in 1998, 2002, and 2004 and defeated an underfunded Democratic candidate in 2000. His district was renumbered the 10th District in 2003, but became the 9th again after a mid-decade redistricting in 2006.

In November 2006, Deal was re-elected 77%–23%. His Democratic opponent was John Bradbury, a former elementary school teacher turned truck driver. His district, already heavily Republican, became even more Republican after the mid-decade redistricting pushed it further into the Atlanta suburbs.

Tenure
Deal's voting record was relatively moderate in his first term, getting ratings in the 60s from the American Conservative Union (ACU). He moved sharply to the right after his party switch and voted for all four articles of impeachment against Bill Clinton. From 1996 onward, he garnered ratings of 90 or higher from the ACU.

During his 17 years in Congress, Deal rose to chair the Health Subcommittee of Energy and Commerce, where he became a noted expert on entitlement reform and health care policy.

Deal introduced H.R. 698, the Citizenship Reform Act, which would eliminate birthright citizenship for undocumented immigrants in the U.S. The 14th Amendment begins "All persons born or naturalized in the United States, and subject to the jurisdiction thereof, are citizens of the United States. ... " Deal's argument is that undocumented immigrants (and their children) are not subject to U.S. jurisdiction.

Committee assignments
 Committee on Energy and Commerce
 Subcommittee on Communications, Technology and the Internet
 Subcommittee on Health (Ranking Member)
 Subcommittee on Oversight and Investigations

Recovery Services, Inc. controversy
The Office of Congressional Ethics released a report on March 30, 2010, that concluded Deal appeared to have improperly used his office staff to pressure Georgia officials to continue the state vehicle inspection program that generated hundreds of thousands of dollars a year for his family's auto salvage business. Deal stated: "I have done nothing wrong and am not going to let this tarnish my ... record of public service."

The Office of Congressional Ethics (OCE), released their investigative report (Review No. 09-1022) on March 30, 2010. The report stipulates,

Representative Nathan Deal and his business partner own Recovery Services, Inc. a/k/a Gainesville Salvage & Disposal ('GSD'), located in Gainesville, Georgia ... The OCE does not take a position on Representative Deal's motivations for inserting himself into discussions of potential modifications to a state vehicle inspection program ... The OCE reviews the facts as presented at the time of review and does not take a position on whether Representative Deal's income from GSD was mistakenly reported as earned income since 2006 on his federal income taxes ... [F]or all the reasons stated above, the OCE Board recommends further review by the Committee on Standards of Official Conduct.

Resignation from Congress
On March 1, 2010, 29 days before the official release of the ethics report, Deal resigned his seat, which he said, excluded him from the Office of Congressional Ethics' jurisdiction. Although this seemed too coincidental for some, Deal maintained in a speech to supporters that the resignation was so that he could "devote [his] full energies" to the gubernatorial campaign.

Before returning to Georgia to run for governor, Deal cast his final congressional vote against the Patient Protection and Affordable Care Act, also known as Obamacare.

2010 gubernatorial election

Incumbent Republican Governor Sonny Perdue was term-limited in 2010. Seven candidates filed to run in the Republican primary. In the initial Republican primary in July, no candidate received the 50% threshold to win the primary outright. Georgia Secretary of State Karen Handel ranked first with 34%, qualifying for the run-off election. Deal, ranked second with 23% of the vote, also qualified for the run-off election.

Candidates who didn't qualify included State Senator Eric Johnson (20%), Insurance Commissioner John Oxendine (16%), State Senator Jeff Chapman (3%), businessman Ray McBerry (3%), and businessman Otis Putnam (0%). Deal performed the strongest in the northern part of the state, where he lives and represented in Congress. However, he also won some counties in the southern part of the state, such as Candler (30%) and Tift (24%). He won five counties with a majority including his home of Hall (64%), Dade (56%), Walker (56%), White (53%), and Stephens (53%).

The run-off election between Handel and Deal was very competitive. Deal was endorsed by former House Speaker Newt Gingrich, U.S. Representative Jack Kingston, and former Arkansas Governor Mike Huckabee. Handel was endorsed by Arizona Governor Jan Brewer and former Alaska Governor Sarah Palin.

On August 10, Deal defeated Handel 50.2%-49.8%, a difference of just 2,519 votes. Handel performed well in the western and eastern borders of the state, as well as the counties surrounding Atlanta. She won the heavily populated Fulton County with 71%, her best performance in the state, followed by Glascock (70%) and Burke (70%). Deal's two best counties were Taliaferro (80%) and Hall (79%).

In the general election, Deal faced former governor and state senator Roy Barnes (D) and John Monds (L). Barnes previously won the 1998 gubernatorial election with 52% of the vote, and lost re-election in 2002 to State Senator Sonny Perdue 51%-46%. Perdue was the first Georgia Republican Governor since Reconstruction.

Barnes has always been considered a moderate. After he lost re-election, he returned to practicing law for eight years until mounting a political comeback. Deal tried to connect Barnes with President Barack Obama. Barnes said "if you would listen to what is being said, you would have thought that this is an election for president of the United States." Barnes also tried to distance himself from Obama, saying his health care law was "the greatest failure of political leadership in my lifetime". On November 3, Deal defeated Barnes 53%-43%.

2011 ethics investigation
In 2011, then Georgia Government Transparency and Campaign Finance Commission Executive Secretary Stacey Kalberman and Deputy Executive Secretary Sherilyn Streiker launched an ethics investigation into Deal's campaign finances during his 2010 gubernatorial race. According to the complaint, Deal had used state campaign funds to pay legal bills stemming from a federal ethics investigation when he was in Congress, that he had personally profited from his gubernatorial campaign's $135,000 rental of aircraft from a company he partly owned, and that he had accepted campaign contributions beyond the legal limits. The campaign also paid a total of $135,000 to consulting companies which were owned by Deal's daughter-in-law and the father of Chris Riley, Deal's chief of staff.

As Kalberman and Streiker were preparing to serve subpoenas to Deal, his chief of staff, and others involved in the case, Kalberman's salary was cut by $35,000 and Streiker was ousted from her position. Soon after, Kalberman was forced to resign and was replaced by Holly LaBerge, who was recruited by the governor's office.

On July 23, 2012, the ethics commission cleared Deal of major ethics violations while finding he made "technical defects" in a series of personal financial and campaign finance reports. In July 2012, Deal agreed to pay $3,350 in administrative fees to resolve violations of campaign finance and disclosure laws.

Holly LaBerge, the head of the ethics commission that cleared Deal of major ethics violations, claimed in July 2014 that Ryan Teague, Deal's counsel, called her to say: "It was not in the agency's best interest for these cases to go to a hearing ... nor was it in their best political interest either." Deal has stated that he is "not aware of any communications along those lines".

2014 gubernatorial election

Deal ran for re-election in 2014. He defeated two primary challengers and defeated Democratic State Senator Jason Carter in the general election with 53% of the vote to Carter's 45%.

Governor of Georgia (2011–2019)

Inauguration
Deal took office as governor on January 10, the second Monday of 2011. His second inauguration took place on January 12, 2015.

Supreme Court expansion
As Governor, Deal expanded the Supreme Court, adding two more justices to the court.

Immigration
In 2011, despite protests outside his office and threats of boycotts, Deal signed Georgia HB 87 into law, which increased the state's enforcement powers in regards to illegal immigration, as well as required many employers to determine whether their newly hired employees are undocumented immigrants or not.

Criminal justice reform

In 2011, Georgia was in the midst of a criminal justice crisis. The prison population had doubled in the past two decades to 56,000, along with the state's incarceration budget. The recidivism rate was 30 percent for adults and 65 percent for juveniles. In response, Deal commissioned the Georgia Criminal Justice Reform Council, tasked with performing an exhaustive review of the state's current system, identifying key areas of focus and providing recommendations for reforms. These areas included increased funding and support for accountability courts, overhauling the juvenile justice system, and implementing prisoner re-entry initiatives. The Council's work resulted in bipartisan legislation that caused Georgia to avoid the need for 5,000 additional prison beds over 5 years and saved taxpayers at least $264 million. A 2014 study showed that  "prison sentences imposed on African-American offenders have dropped by 20 percent."

On April 25, 2013, Deal signed HB 349 into law, which enacted a second round of criminal justice reforms. These reforms took a "smart on crime" approach and were based on recommendations from the Special Council on Criminal Justice Reform. This law gave those who, while locked up, have earned money toward college in the form of a HOPE Scholarship G-E-D Voucher the ability to use that money up to two years after their release. In addition, Deal reinvested $5 million to create a voluntary grant program that gives communities incentives to offer judges more non-confinement sentencing options. These could include substance abuse treatment or family counseling.

With the help of the Council and the Vera Institute of Justice,  Deal developed extensive performance measures to track the success of previous reforms to ensure they were enhancing public safety and saving taxpayer dollars. The Atlanta Journal-Constitution reported, "Since 2007 alone, more than three-dozen such courts have opened their doors across Georgia. In the first quarter of 2014, more than 4,100 offenders were enrolled in the state's 105 accountability courts, and many of these participants would likely be in prison without this alternative."

On April 25, 2014, Deal announced the creation of the Governor's Interfaith Council, composed of religious leaders across Georgia, to expand upon recent criminal justice reforms. These programs and council advisors will implement cost-effective strategies will work to increase the number of former offenders returning to the workforce and supporting their families. By removing barriers to employment, housing and education for rehabilitated offenders, a larger number of returning citizens are able to rejoin the workforce and support their families. Some of Deal's initiatives include education and jobs training programs, "banning the box" and creation of the Department of Community Supervision, which streamlines re-entry programs across various state agencies.

Safe Carry Protection Act
In 2014, Deal signed House Bill (H.B.) 60, the Safe Carry Protection Act, referred to by critics as the "Guns Everywhere" Law.  Deal stated that gun rights through the United States Constitution's Second Amendment are important to people in Georgia.  The Safe Carry Protection Act took effect on July 1, 2014, and permits licensed gun owners to carry guns into many public and private places, including churches, school property, bars, nightclubs, libraries, and some government buildings in Georgia.  The law was supported by the Georgia Baptist Convention which included 3,600 Baptist churches in Georgia in favor of increased church autonomy, but was not supported by Catholic or Episcopalian church leaders due to their belief that it is against Jesus' teachings. By 2016, The Atlanta Journal-Constitution found that while 57% of Georgians believed that owning a gun protects people, 59% disapproved of the law itself.

Resettlement of Syrian refugees
In 2015 Deal issued an executive order ordering state agencies to "halt any involvement in accepting refugees from Syria for resettlement in the state of Georgia", resulting in the state's Department of Human Resources refusing to process applications for food stamps and other benefits filed by newly arrived Syrian refugees. Deal rescinded his order on January 4, 2016, after Georgia Attorney General Sam Olens said Deal lacked the authority to issue it.

Religious liberty bill veto
On March 28, 2016, Deal vetoed a religious liberty bill that had been passed by both houses of the Georgia State Legislature, and that had been opposed by multiple large corporations, including Salesforce.com, the Coca-Cola Company and the Home Depot.

Campus carry
On May 3, 2016, Deal vetoed a campus carry bill that had been passed by the state legislature, after a number of state legislators refused to include exceptions for child-care centers and other places on college campuses. Had Deal signed the bill into law, it would have made concealed carrying of guns legal at every public college in Georgia, so long as the carrier was 21 or older and had a proper permit. One year later, on May 4, 2017, Deal signed a revised and stricter version of the campus carry bill into law.

Deal was succeeded by Governor Brian Kemp on January 14, 2019.

Electoral history

{| class="wikitable" style="margin:0.5em ; font-size:95%"
|+ : Results 1992–2000, 2006–2008;: Results 2002–2004
!|Year
!|District
!
!|Democratic
!|Votes
!|Pct
!
!|Republican
!|Votes
!|Pct
!
|-
|1992
|
|
| |Nathan Deal
| align="right" |113,024
| |59%
|
| |Daniel Becker
| align="right" |77,919
| |41%
|
|-
|1994
|
|
| |Nathan Deal
| align="right" |79,145
| |58%
|
| |
| align="right" |57,568
| |42%
|
|-
|1996
|
|
| |
| align="right" |69,662
| |34%
|
| |Nathan Deal
| align="right" |132,532
| |66%
|
|-
|1998
|
|
| |(no candidate)
| align="right" |
| |
|
| |Nathan Deal
| align="right" |122,713
| |100%
|
|-
|2000
|
|
| |
| align="right" |60,360
| |25%
|
| |Nathan Deal
| align="right" |183,171
| |75%
|
|-
|2002
|
|
| |(no candidate)
| align="right" |
| |
|
| |Nathan Deal
| align="right" |129,242
| |100%
|
|-
|2004
|
|
| |(no candidate)
| align="right" |
| |
|
| |Nathan Deal
| align="right" |219,136
| |100%
|
|-
|2006
|
|
| |
| align="right" |39,240
| |23%
|
| |Nathan Deal
| align="right" |128,685
| |77%
|
|-
|2008
|
|
| |Jeff Scott
| align="right" |70,401
| |25%
|
| |Nathan Deal
| align="right" |216,925
| |75%
|

See also
 
 
 
 
 
 Georgia gubernatorial election, 2010
 List of American politicians who switched parties in office
 List of United States representatives who switched parties

References

External links

 Georgia Governor Nathan Deal official government site
 Nathan Deal for Governor
 
 
Congress
 
 Profile at SourceWatch
Articles
 NYT Article on effects of his anti-illegal immigration legislation March 12, 2007
 

|-

|-

|-

|-

|-

|-

|-

|-

1942 births
20th-century American lawyers
20th-century American politicians
21st-century American politicians
American prosecutors
Democratic Party members of the United States House of Representatives from Georgia (U.S. state)
Baptists from Georgia (U.S. state)
Georgia (U.S. state) lawyers
Georgia (U.S. state) state court judges
Republican Party Georgia (U.S. state) state senators
Georgia Salzburgers
Living people
Mercer University alumni
Military personnel from Georgia (U.S. state)
People from Gainesville, Georgia
People from Millen, Georgia
Presidents pro tempore of the Georgia State Senate
Republican Party members of the United States House of Representatives
Republican Party governors of Georgia (U.S. state)
Southern Baptists
United States Army officers
Superior court judges in the United States